Saint-André-de-Restigouche is a municipality in Quebec, Canada.

Its economy is mostly dependent on agriculture, as well as forestry. The International Appalachian Trail traverses the municipality.

History

In 1760, the site was the scene of the last battle between the English and French, which resulted in the destruction of the settlement and the displacement of its population to the east. It was repopulated by Acadians and French Canadians in the 19th century.

In 1842, the geographic township of Ristigouche was formed, named after the Restigouche River (Ristigouche in French) on which it bordered. In 1855, it was incorporated as the Township Municipality of Ristigouche. In 1908, the Parish of Saint-André was established, named in honour of André-Albert Blais (1842-1919), bishop of Rimouski from 1891 to 1919.

In 1907, the township lost the south-eastern portion of its territory when it separated to form the Township Municipality of Ristigouche-Partie-Sud-Est.

In 1989, the township changed its name and status to Municipality of Saint-André-de-Restigouche, choosing to adopt the parish name to avoid confusion with other places.

Demographics

Population

Language
Mother tongue (2006):
 English only: 15.8%
 French only: 78.9%
 English and French: 0%
 Other languages: 5.3%

See also
 List of municipalities in Quebec

References

Incorporated places in Gaspésie–Îles-de-la-Madeleine
Municipalities in Quebec